Czarne  (formerly ) is a town in Człuchów County of the Pomeranian Voivodeship in northwestern Poland. As of December 2021, the town has a population of 5,747.

Demographics

History

The area formed part of the Kingdom of Poland until the Teutonic invasion in 1308. Konrad von Jungingen granted the settlement town privileges in 1395. It lay on the bank of the Czarna river, hence its modern name. It was an important trade and military point due to the nearby Teutonic Order and Pomeranian frontier. In 1454 the town and region were incorporated to Poland by King Casimir IV Jagiellon. After the Thirteen Years' War, according to the Second Peace of Thorn (1466), it was recognized as part of Poland. Since then the town was part of the Pomeranian Voivodeship in the Polish province of Royal Prussia, and later also in the province of Greater Poland. Czarne was the seat of the starosts (local royal administrators), they resided in the local castle. In 1627, it was site of the Battle of Czarne, in which Poles under the command of Stanisław Koniecpolski defeated the invading Swedes.

After the First Partition of Poland in 1772 the town was annexed by Prussia. It became part of the newly established Province of West Prussia in 1773. Prussian authorities ordered the demolition of the Czarne castle. In 1885 the Prussian Army built a large training ground (Übungsplatz) there. 

In World War I the German Army used it for a large prisoner-of-war camp for Russian prisoners. In World War II it was the site of the notorious Stalag II-B in which tens of thousands, mainly Soviet prisoners, died from disease, mistreatment and malnutrition. In 1945 the town became part of Poland under the terms of the post-war Potsdam Agreement.

Notable residents
 Rudolf Hellgrewe (1860–1935), landscape painter and illustrator, painted Germany's colonies. 
 Alexander Beer (1873–1944), architect
 Henryk Moruś (1943–2013), Polish serial killer who was convicted in 1993 for committing seven murders

See also
 Stalag II-B

References

External links
 French site about Stalag II-B

Cities and towns in Pomeranian Voivodeship
Człuchów County